Edward Allen Hinds FInstP FAPS FRS (born 8 Sept 1949) is a British physicist noted for his work with cold matter.

He was educated at Dame Allan's School in Newcastle before being offered a place at Jesus College, Oxford, where he matriculated in 1968. He obtained both an undergraduate degree and a doctorate before moving to the United States to teach at Columbia University.

He served as professor of physics at Yale University before returning to the United Kingdom in 1994 to start the Sussex Centre for Optical and Atomic Physics at Sussex University.

He is currently (2014) a Royal Society Research Professor and director of the Centre for Cold Matter at Imperial College London, where his research is concentrated on fundamental problems in physics and on new methods for producing and manipulating cold atoms and molecules.

Honours and awards
Source: Imperial College
 Royal Society Bakerian Medal, 2019
 Faraday Medal and Prize, Institute of Physics, 2013
 Rumford Medal, Royal Society, 2008
 Thomson Medal and Prize, Institute of Physics, 2008
 Royal Society Research Professor, Royal Society, 2006
 Fellow of the Royal Society, 2004
 Fellow of the Optical Society of America, 2002
 EPSRC Senior Research Fellow, 1999
 Humboldt Prize, 1998
 Royal Society Leverhulme Trust Senior Research Fellow, 1998
 Fellow of the Institute of Physics, 1996
 Fellow of the American Physical Society, 1994

References

Living people
1949 births
British physicists
Alumni of Jesus College, Oxford
Academics of Imperial College London
Columbia University faculty
Yale University faculty
Fellows of the Royal Society
People educated at Dame Allan's School
Fellows of the American Physical Society
Fellows of Optica (society)
Fellows of the Institute of Physics